See also Building regulations in the United Kingdom

The Building Regulations 2000 (S.I. 2000/2531) are  regulations imposed on the England and Wales Construction industry by Statutory Instrument.

The regulations were signed by Nick Raynsford, Minister of State, Department of the Environment, Transport and the Regions.

Arrangement
The Regulations are divided into six parts and a further 3 Schedules are attached.

Part I General
Part II Control of building work
Part III Exemption of public bodies from procedural requirements
Part IV Relaxation of requirements
Part V Notices and plans
Part VI Miscellaneous

Schedule 1 Requirements. 
Schedule 2 Exempt buildings and work. 
Schedule 3 Revocation of regulations.

Exempt buildings and work (Sched 2)
The regulations specify seven classes of building which are exempt.

I Buildings controlled under other legislation; II Buildings not frequented by people; III Greenhouses and agricultural buildings; IV Temporary buildings; V Ancillary buildings; VI Small detached buildings; and VII Extensions.

Small detached buildings
The following buildings are exempted from the regulations

A detached building, with less than 15m2 floor area containing no sleeping accommodation.
 A detached single storey building, with less than 30m2 floor area. It must be constructed substantially of non-combustible material, contain no sleeping accommodation and no point be within one metre of the property boundary.
 Bomb shelters with less than 30m2 floor area.

Amendments
The Building (Amendment) Regulations 2001 (SI 2001/3335)
The Building (Amendment) Regulations 2002 (SI 2002/440) 
The Building (Amendment) (No. 2) Regulations 2002 (SI 2002/2871)  
The Building (Amendment) Regulations 2003 (SI 2003/2692)

Statutory Instruments of the United Kingdom
2000 in British law